Vladimir Nikolayevich Lovetskiy (born 26 October 1951 in Zhlobin, Belarusian SSR) was a Soviet athlete who competed mainly in the 100 metres. He trained in Minsk at Trudovye Rezervy.

He competed for the USSR in the 1972 Summer Olympics held in Munich, Germany in the 4 x 100 metre relay where he won the silver medal with his team mates Aleksandr Kornelyuk, Juris Silovs and Valeriy Borzov.

External links
 An interview with Vladimir Lovetsky

1951 births
Living people
People from Zhlobin District
Soviet male sprinters
Belarusian male sprinters
Olympic silver medalists for the Soviet Union
Athletes (track and field) at the 1972 Summer Olympics
Olympic athletes of the Soviet Union
Medalists at the 1972 Summer Olympics
Olympic silver medalists in athletics (track and field)
Sportspeople from Gomel Region
Medalists at the 1973 Summer Universiade
Universiade silver medalists for the Soviet Union
Universiade medalists in athletics (track and field)